Edward Gordon Douglas-Pennant, 1st Baron Penrhyn (20 June 1800 – 31 March 1886), was a Scottish landowner in Wales, and a Conservative Party  politician. He played a major part in the development of the Welsh slate industry.

Life

Born Edward Gordon Douglas, he was the younger son of the Hon. John Douglas and his wife Lady Frances (née Lascelles). The 14th Earl of Morton was his paternal grandfather and The 17th Earl of Morton was his elder brother. He served as an officer in the Grenadier Guards.

He inherited the Penrhyn Estate near Bangor in north-west Wales through his wife's father, George Hay Dawkins-Pennant, and changed his name to Douglas-Pennant by Royal licence in 1841. This made him the owner of the Penrhyn Quarry near Bethesda, Wales, which under his ownership developed into one of the two largest slate quarries in the world. He was also involved in politics and sat as Member of Parliament for Caernarvonshire between 1841 and 1866. He also held the honorary post of Lord Lieutenant of Caernarvonshire. On 30 August 1852 he was commissioned as Lieutenant-Colonel Commandant to revive and command the county militia regiment, the Royal Carnarvon Rifles. He commanded the regiment until 1858, when he became its Honorary Colonel. 

In 1866 he was raised to the peerage as Baron Penrhyn, of Llandegai in the County of Carnarvon.

In 1868 he sacked 80 workers from Penrhyn Quarry for failing to vote for his son, George Douglas-Pennant, in the general election.

The village of Llandygai was developed by Lord Penrhyn as a ‘model village’ for his estate workers, in which ‘no corrupting alehouse’ was permitted. The village lies immediately outside of the walls of the Penrhyn Castle demesne walls, with the entrance to the village being some 100m from the castle's Grand Lodge.

Lord Penrhyn died in 1886, aged 85.

Family
Lord Penrhyn married, firstly, Juliana Isabella Mary, daughter of George Hay Dawkins-Pennant, in 1833. They had two sons and three daughters. After her death in 1842 he married, secondly, Maria Louisa, daughter of Henry FitzRoy, 5th Duke of Grafton, in 1846. They had eight daughters. He was succeeded in the barony by his eldest son, George.

Notes

References
Dictionary of Welsh Biography
 Burke's Peerage, Baronetage and Knightage, 100th Edn, London, 1953.
 Kidd, Charles, Williamson, David (editors). Debrett's Peerage and Baronetage (1990 edition). New York: St Martin's Press, 1990.
 Bryn Owen, History of the Welsh Militia and Volunteer Corps 1757–1908: 1: Anglesey and Caernarfonshire, Caernarfon: Palace Books, 1989, ISBN 1-871904-00-5.

External links 
 

1800 births
1886 deaths
British mining businesspeople
19th-century Scottish businesspeople
History of Gwynedd
Grenadier Guards officers
Lord-Lieutenants of Caernarvonshire
Carnarvon Militia officers
Slate industry in Wales
19th-century Welsh businesspeople
UK MPs 1841–1847
UK MPs 1847–1852
UK MPs 1852–1857
UK MPs 1857–1859
UK MPs 1859–1865
UK MPs 1865–1868
UK MPs who were granted peerages
Conservative Party (UK) MPs for Welsh constituencies
Edward Douglas-Pennant, 1st Baron Penrhyn
Scottish landowners
Welsh landowners
1
Edward
Peers of the United Kingdom created by Queen Victoria